Lorne Honickman is a lawyer and journalist in Toronto, Ontario, Canada. He is legal analyst for and a regular panelist on The John Oakley Show on radio station AM640, where he also acts as guest host when the occasion arises. He used to be a reporter for Toronto's City TV and a television presenter and a legal specialist on Toronto television station CP24.  He was seen on a weekly one-hour television show Legal Briefs on CP24 and CourtTV Canada.

Education

Honickman has the following degrees:

 H. Bsc., Specialist Degree, Psychology, University of Toronto
 Bachelor of Laws, Osgoode Hall Law School (Toronto)

References
https://web.archive.org/web/20070819190240/http://www.citynews.ca/shows/personalities_650.aspx
http://www.cp24.com/servlet/an/local/CTVNews/20090115/bio_lorne_honickman/20090115/?hub=CP24About

Canadian television journalists
Canadian radio journalists
Canadian lawyers
Academic staff of York University
Living people
Year of birth missing (living people)